The Australian cricket team in England in 1880 played nine first-class matches including one Test, which was the first ever played in England. They were captained by W.L. Murdoch. The team had difficulty in arranging fixtures against the counties, and prior to the Test match in early September had played only four matches that are now rated as first-class (as well as many fixtures against weaker opposition), despite having already been in England for almost four months.

The Test was a late addition to the programme, being arranged at the instigation of the Surrey secretary, C. W. Alcock, who asked Lord Harris to put together a side. A. N. Hornby, Tom Emmett and George Ulyett refused to play, having unpleasant memories of the Sydney Riot of 1879, but Australia were also seriously handicapped, being without their star bowler, Fred Spofforth.

The Australians won 4, drew 3 and lost 2 of their first-class fixtures. Their only loss other than to England was to Nottinghamshire. That defeat was by only one wicket and came in a match in which they played a man short.

Australian tour party

The Australian party consisted of: W.L. Murdoch (captain), A.C. Bannerman, J.McC. Blackham, G.J. Bonnor, H.F. Boyle, T.U. Groube, A.H. Jarvis, P.S. McDonnell, W.H. Moule, G.E. Palmer, J. Slight, F.R. Spofforth, G. Alexander (player-manager).

Tour matches
17 May 1880 	Derbyshire v Australians 	County Ground, Derby - Australia won by 8 wickets in two days, and a fill-in match was played on the third day which ended in a draw
10 Jun 1880 	 Yorkshire v Australians 	Dewsbury and Savile Ground - Australia won by 5 wickets
22 Jul 1880 	  Yorkshire v Australians 	Fartown, Huddersfield - Match drawn
02 Aug 1880 	Gloucestershire v Australians 	Clifton College Close Ground - Australia won by 68 runs
13 Sep 1880 	Sussex v Australians 	County Ground, Hove - Match drawn
20 Sep 1880 	Players of the North v Australians 	Park Avenue Cricket Ground, Bradford - Match drawn
23 Sep 1880 	Nottinghamshire v Australians 	Trent Bridge, Nottingham - Nottinghamshire won by 1 wicket
27 Sep 1880 	Players v Australians 	Crystal Palace Park - Australia won by 2 wickets

In addition the Australian tourists played 45 minor matches that were not of first class cricket status.

Test match

See also
 History of Test cricket from 1877 to 1883

External links
 CricketArchive

External sources
 CricketArchive – season summaries

Annual reviews
 James Lillywhite's Cricketers' Annual (Red Lilly) 1881
 John Lillywhite's Cricketer's Companion (Green Lilly) 1881
 Wisden Cricketers' Almanack 1881

Further reading
 Derek Birley, A Social History of English Cricket, Aurum, 1999
 Bill Frindall, The Wisden Book of Test Cricket 1877-1978, Wisden, 1979
 Chris Harte, A History of Australian Cricket, Andre Deutsch, 1993
 Ray Robinson, On Top Down Under, Cassell, 1975
 Ralph Barker & Irving Rosenwater, England v Australia: A compendium of Test cricket between the countries 1877-1968, Batsford, 1969, pp6–7.

1880 in Australian cricket
1880 in English cricket
International cricket competitions from 1844 to 1888
1880
English cricket seasons in the 19th century